In Linux, FreeBSD, NetBSD  or the always full device, is a special file that always returns the error code  (meaning "No space left on device") on writing, and provides an infinite number of zero bytes to any process that reads from it (similar to ). This device is usually used when testing the behaviour of a program when it encounters a "disk full" error.
$ echo "Hello world" > /dev/full
bash: echo: write error: No space left on device

History
Support for the always-full device in Linux is documented as early as 2007. Native support was added to FreeBSD in the 11.0 release in 2016, which had previously supported it through an optional module called lindev. The full device appeared in NetBSD 8.

See also
 
 
 
 Fault injection
  in 9front

References

Device file
Software testing
Unix file system technology